Megachile monstrosa is a species of bee in the family Megachilidae. It was described by Smith in 1868.

References

Monstrosa
Insects described in 1868